The Knud Rasmussen class is a class of offshore patrol vessels operating in the Royal Danish Navy from 2008. Built to replace the s on a one-for-one basis, the Knud Rasmussen-class vessels are significantly larger, enabling patrols further offshore.

The ships' normal tasks include fisheries inspections, environment protection, search and rescue, sovereignty enforcement, icebreaker assignments (Finnish-Swedish ice class 1A Super/Polar Class 6), towage and salvage operations and general assistance to the Danish and Greenland governments (including police tasks). The class has a helicopter deck aft behind the superstructure but lacks an aircraft hangar. However, it can perform Rotors running refueling and can thus increase the endurance and the range of the helicopter. The estimated cost of the third ship as of 2013 was 513 mill Dkr (US$ ).

Armament
The standard armament consists of two  heavy machine guns. This is supplemented by the two Stanflex modular mission payload slots (one on the foredeck, the other aft of the superstructure), which can be fitted with a multi-purpose gun, surface-to-air missiles, or ASW torpedoes, along with other non-weapon payloads. Another two container positions are "prepared for" but not installed on the starboard and port sides of the heli deck.

List of ships

References

External links
 Official presentation (Danish)

Patrol ship classes